True Colours is an Australian drama miniseries broadcast from 4 July 2022 on SBS TV and NITV. The four-part miniseries was created, written and directed by Erica Glynn and Steven McGregor, and stars Rarriwuy Hick as a detective in a remote community in the Northern Territory.

Synopsis
True Colours tells the story of detective Toni Alma, who is assigned to investigate a suspicious car accident in Perdar Theendar, the Aboriginal community she left as a child. The story touches on the place of Indigenous Australian art and the practices of the global art world, and explores Aboriginal culture.

Cast
 Rarriwuy Hick as Detective Toni Alma
 Warren H. Williams as Samuel Alma
 Luke Arnold as Nick Gawler
 Errol Shand as Bull 
 Emilie de Ravin as Liz Hindmarsh 
 Trisha Morton-Thomas as Theodora 
 Ben Oxenbould as Gingerbread Man 
 Miranda Otto as Isabelle Martin

Episodes

Production  

The four-part miniseries was created, written and directed by Erica Glynn and Steven McGregor. Danielle MacLean also wrote for the series, which was produced by Greer Simpkin, David Jowsey and Penny Smallacombe for SBS Television and NITV.

It was filmed entirely on location in the Macdonnell Ranges, east of Alice Springs / Mparntwe, including in the community of Amoonguna. Hundreds of works by artists from Central Australia feature in the series, which represents Arrernte culture and language.

Release and reception 
True Colours premiered simultaneously on SBS Television and National Indigenous TV on 4 July 2022 as well as on SBS on Demand, running over four consecutive nights on television.

Critics gave the series favourable reviews, with TV Week'' calling it "authentic and powerful".

References

External links 
  

English-language television shows
Special Broadcasting Service original programming
2022 Australian television series debuts